This is a list of National Conservation Lands managed by the Bureau of Land Management in the U.S. State of Colorado. The Bureau of Land Management manages the National Landscape Conservation System in the Western United States.


National Monuments

The Bureau of Land Management manages two of the eight National Monuments in Colorado:
Browns Canyon National Monument
Canyons of the Ancients National Monument

National Conservation Areas

The Bureau of Land Management manages the three National Conservation Areas within Colorado.
Dominguez–Escalante National Conservation Area
Gunnison Gorge National Conservation Area
McInnis Canyons National Conservation Area

National Wildernesses

The Bureau of Land Management manages five of the 44 National Wildernesses within Colorado.
Black Ridge Canyons Wilderness
Dominguez Canyon Wilderness
Gunnison Gorge Wilderness
Powderhorn Wilderness
Uncompahgre Wilderness

National Historic Trails

The Bureau of Land Management manages portions of one of the four National Historic Trails that pass through Colorado:
Old Spanish National Historic Trail

National Scenic Trail

The Bureau of Land Management manages portions of the National Scenic Trail that passes through Colorado:
Continental Divide National Scenic Trail

Other federal lands

The Bureau of Land Management manages the extensive federal land holdings in western Colorado not managed by another federal agency.

Areas of Critical Environmental Concern

The Bureau of Land Management has designated 88 Areas of Critical Environmental Concern in Western Colorado.

See also

Colorado
Bibliography of Colorado
Index of Colorado-related articles
Outline of Colorado
Colorado statistical areas
Geography of Colorado
History of Colorado
List of counties in Colorado
List of places in Colorado
List of mountain passes in Colorado
List of mountain peaks of Colorado
List of mountain ranges of Colorado
List of populated places in Colorado
List of census-designated places in Colorado
List of county seats in Colorado
List of forts in Colorado
List of ghost towns in Colorado
List of historic places in Colorado
List of municipalities in Colorado
List of post offices in Colorado
List of rivers of Colorado
List of protected areas of Colorado

Notes

External links

United States federal government website
United States Department of the Interior website
Bureau of Land Management website

Colorado geography-related lists
Colorado history-related lists
Bureau of Land Management areas in Colorado
Protected areas of Colorado
Tourist attractions in Colorado
Colorado, List of national conservation lands in